The United States Penitentiary, Beaumont (USP Beaumont) is a high security United States federal prison for male inmates in unincorporated Jefferson County, Texas. It is part of the Federal Correctional Complex, Beaumont (FCC Beaumont) and is operated by the Federal Bureau of Prisons, a division of the United States Department of Justice.

Notable incidents

1999 inmate murder 
On December 16, 1999, inmates Arzell Gulley and David Lee Jackson began arguing with another inmate, Darryl Brown. The argument resulted in Gulley and Jackson chasing Brown into a housing unit with "shanks", until they cornered him in a cell. The duo then stabbed Brown a total of 11 times, killing him. Autopsy found that a single knife strike hit Brown's left lung, resulting in his death. Gulley and Jackson were both indicted for the murder of Brown in 2005 and sentenced to life in prison. Gulley is currently serving his sentence at USP Lee, while Jackson is at USP Pollock.

2001 inmate murder 
On January 5, 2001, inmate Luther Plant was beaten and stomped to death by inmate Shannon Wayne Agofksy in an exercise cage. Plant was serving a 15-year sentence for drug offences while Agofsky was serving a life sentence for armed robbery of a bank, and the subsequent kidnapping and murder of the bank president in Noel, Missouri. Autopsy revealed that Plant suffered numerous injuries including a crushed neck, abrasions on his head, a broken jaw and nose, hemorrhaging around both eyes, 4 broken teeth, and internal bleeding in the lungs, trachea, esophagus, and stomach. Agofsky was convicted of Plant's murder in 2004 and sentenced to death, he is currently on death row at USP Terre Haute.

2005 inmate murder 
On May 7, 2005, inmates Marwin Mosley and Joseph Ebron entered the cell of inmate Keith Barnes where Ebron held Barnes down as Mosley stabbed him 106 times, killing him. Barnes was incarcerated for murder and conspiracy to rob, however, he became a target for Mosley and Ebron due to his testimony against a co-defendant for a reduced sentence. Mosley committed suicide in prison in 2006, and Ebron was charged with first-degree murder in the case and sentenced to death in 2009. Additionally, Michael Bacote, the inmate who acted as the lookout during the homicide was charged with second-degree murder and sentenced to 28 years in prison. Ebron is currently housed on death row at USP Terre Haute, while Bacote is serving his sentence at USP Allenwood.

2007 inmate murder
On November 28, 2007, correction officers were escorting inmates Mark Snarr (11093-081) and Edgar Garcia (28132-177) to their cells at the USP Beaumont.  When they arrived, Snarr and Garcia slipped from their restraints, repeatedly stabbed both correction officers with homemade prison knives known as shanks, and took the officers' cell keys.

Snarr and Garcia then unlocked the cell of inmate Gabriel Rhone (09304-007) and stabbed Rhone over 50 times.  Additional officers arrived and used chemical agents to stop the attack, which lasted several minutes and was captured on surveillance camera.  The wounded corrections officers and Rhone were transported to a local hospital, where Rhone was pronounced dead. The officers were treated and survived.

Attorneys for Snarr and Garcia claimed that Rhone had repeatedly threatened to kill their clients and that prison officials had failed to respond to those threats.  However, Snarr and Garcia were subsequently convicted of murder and both were sentenced to death on May 24, 2010. They are currently being held on death row at USP Terre Haute.

2008 inmate murder
On February 12, 2008, USP Beaumont staff discovered the body of a 29-year-old inmate, Ronald Joseph, in his cell. An autopsy showed that Joseph died from asphyxia due to ligature strangulation or compression of the neck. Further investigation identified James Sweeney (58827-066) and Harry Lee Napper (32403-037), both inmates at USP Beaumont, as suspects in the murder. Sweeney and Napper were indicted and charged with first-degree murder, conspiracy to commit murder, and second-degree murder on May 4, 2011. In 2012, Sweeney pleaded guilty to racketeering and murder charges for leading the prison gang Dead Man Incorporated in exchange for the murder charge being dismissed and was sentenced to life in prison. Napper received a decades-long sentence. Sweeney is now at USP Canaan, and Napper is at USP McCreary.

2014 inmate murder 
On March 3, 2014, inmates Ricky Fackrell and Christopher Cramer stabbed inmate Leo Johns to death. Fackrell, Cramer, and Johns were all members of the white supremacist prison gang Soldiers of Aryan Culture (SAC). Fackrell and Cramer decided they needed to punish Johns for gambling and drinking, activities that are prohibited for SAC members. Defense counsel for Fackrell claimed that the men only agreed to assault Johns, however, both men were convicted of first-degree murder and conspiracy to commit murder and sentenced to death in 2018. Fackrell and Cramer were initially housed at ADX Florence, but transferred to USP Terre Haute after sentencing.

2022 fatal altercation
On the morning of Monday, January 31, 2022, multiple MS-13 members began attacking associates of the Mexican Mafia and the Surenos. Although officers responded quickly, four inmates were severely injured and taken to the hospital. Of them, 34-year-old Andrew Pineda and 54-year-old Guillermo Riojas would later be pronounced dead. 
In the aftermath of the deadly fight, the United States Bureau of Prisons enacted a lockdown across the entire Federal Prison network. On April 7, 2022, 7 members of MS-13 were charged with racketeering conspiracy, murder in aid of racketeering, and other offences related to the brawl. The indictment named Juan Carlos Rivas-Moreiera, Dimas Alfaro-Granados, Rual Landaverde-Giron, Larry Navarete, Jorge Parada, Hector Ramires, and Sergio Sibrian as defendants.

Notable inmates (current and former)

See also
 List of U.S. federal prisons
 Federal Bureau of Prisons
 Incarceration in the United States

References

External links
 Federal Correctional Institution, Beaumont – Official website

Buildings of the United States government in Texas
1998 establishments in Texas
Beaumont
Prisons in Jefferson County, Texas